National Slavery Museum may refer to:

National Museum of Slavery, in Luanda, Angola
United States National Slavery Museum, an unfunded proposal

See also
International Slavery Museum, in Liverpool, England